My Wildest Dreams is an American sitcom that aired on Fox on Sunday nights at 9:30 pm from May 28 to June 25, 1995.

Plot
The series centered on Lisa McGinnis, a mother of two, who worked at a recording studio and had fantasies of being a rock star. She lived with her husband Jack, who ran a sporting goods store, and her children, Danny and Delilah, in suburban New Jersey.

Cast
Lisa Ann Walter as Lisa McGinnis
John Posey as Jack McGinnis
J. Evan Bonifant as Danny McGinnis
Mary Jo Keenen as Stephanie James
Kelly Bishop as Gloria James
Miguel A. Nunez Jr as Chandler Trapp

Episodes

References

External links

Fox Broadcasting Company original programming
Television shows set in New Jersey
1995 American television series debuts
1995 American television series endings
1990s American sitcoms
Television series by Sony Pictures Television
English-language television shows